Everyone for Mexico, was a political coalition encompassing the Institutional Revolutionary Party (PRI), New Alliance (PANAL), and the Ecologist Green Party of Mexico (PVEM) to compete in the 2018 Mexican general election led by the presumptive nominee José Antonio Meade Kuribreña. The campaign was previously known as Meade Ciudadano por México (Citizen Meade for Mexico) until INE deemed unconstitutional the usage of the name of a political candidate within the name of a coalition, stating that allowing it would make Meade receive extra benefit from every piece of propaganda of the coalition.

Following the election, the New Alliance Party was dissolved because of failure to reach the 3% electoral threshold. On 28 August 2018, the Ecologist Green Party of Mexico announced it was leaving Everyone for Mexico, thus ending the coalition.

Presidential elections

Congressional elections

Chamber of Deputies

Senate

See also
Juntos Haremos Historia (MORENA, PT, and PES) coalition
Por México al Frente (PAN, PRD, and MC) coalition
List of political parties in Mexico
2018 Mexican general election

References
Content in this edit is from the existing Spanish Wikipedia article at Meade Ciudadano por México; see its history for attribution. Formatting follows.

Defunct political party alliances in Mexico
Ecologist Green Party of Mexico
Institutional Revolutionary Party
New Alliance Party (Mexico)